Hamilton Downs Station was a cattle station west of Alice Springs in the Northern Territory of Australia. It is now a youth camp.

Establishment

Hamilton Downs was established in 1910 by hotel manager Sid Stanes Jr. and Ted Harris. It is named after a spring near Jay Creek which was named by John McDouall Stuart in 1860, after his supporter George Hamilton. The first substantial homestead was built in 1913.

The station was managed for some time by pioneer Aboriginal woman Amelia Kunoth and her husband Harry. By the 1940s, it was run by the Davis Brothers, Pat and John who invested in developing the water infrastructure of the property. by the 1950s the property was turning of over 3000 head of cattle per year.

Queen Elizabeth II visited the station in February 1963, during her Australian tour.

Recent history

Hamilton Downs has also been the location of a youth camp since March 1978. It was run by Apex Club of Central Australia but is now managed by an independent committee.

Significant restoration works were completed on the homesteads and stables in 1972. Five buildings on the property were heritage listed in 1993. The station celebrated its 100th birthday in 2011.

See also
List of ranches and stations

References

Pastoral leases in the Northern Territory